Bartolozzi is an Italian surname. Notable people with the surname include:

 Bruno Bartolozzi (1911–1980), Italian composer
 Francesco Bartolozzi (1725–1815), Italian engraver
 Gaetano Stefano Bartolozzi (1757–1821), Italian engraver, son of Francesco Bartolozzi
 Waldemaro Bartolozzi (born 1927–2020), Italian former racing cyclist

Italian-language surnames
Patronymic surnames
Surnames from given names